William Parr, 1st Marquess of Northampton, Earl of Essex, 1st Baron Parr, 1st Baron Hart  (14 August 151328 October 1571), was the only brother of Queen Catherine Parr, the sixth and final wife of King Henry VIII. He was a "sincere, plain, direct man, not crafty nor involved", whose "delight was music and poetry and his exercise war" who co-authored a treatise on hare coursing. He was in favour with Henry VIII and his son Edward VI, under whom he was the leader of the Protestant party, but having supported the desire of the latter to be succeeded by the Protestant Lady Jane Grey, was attainted by Edward's Catholic half-sister, Queen Mary I. He was restored by her Protestant half-sister, Queen Elizabeth I. He married thrice but died without issue.

Origins
He was the only son and heir of the courtier Sir Thomas Parr (d.1517) of Parr in the parish of Prescot, Lancashire and of Kendal in Westmorland, by his wife Maud Green (d.1531) a daughter and co-heiress of Sir Thomas Green of Broughton and Greens Norton in Northamptonshire. His younger sister was Anne Parr (1515-1552) wife of William Herbert, 1st Earl of Pembroke (c.1501-1570).

Career
His father died in 1517 when William was aged 4 and he became a ward of King Henry VIII, from whom his mother re-purchased his marriage, at great expense. Parr took part in suppressing the rising in the North of England in 1537, when he attracted the favourable notice of Thomas Howard, 3rd Duke of Norfolk (uncle of both Queen Anne Boleyn and Queen Catherine Howard), encouraging his uncle Sir William Parr (c.1483-1547) of Horton, Northamptonshire, to obtain a place for him as a courtier in the king's privy chamber. After serving as a Member of Parliament for Northamptonshire he was created Baron Parr ("of Kendal") in 1539. On 23 April 1543, he became a Knight of the Garter. On 23 December 1543, just after his sister had married the king, he was created Earl of Essex, a title held by his late father-in-law Henry Bourchier, 2nd Earl of Essex, who had died without male issue in March 1540. That same year, he was made Baron Hart.

He was King Edward VI's "beloved uncle" (in fact step-uncle, being the brother of that king's step-mother) and one of the most important men at Edward's court, and the leader of the Protestant party, especially during the time of John Dudley, 1st Duke of Northumberland's time as leader of the government. Parr served as Lord Lieutenant in 1549 of five of the eastern counties (Cambridgeshire, Huntingdonshire, Bedfordshire, Northamptonshire and Norfolk), of Surrey in 1551, of Berkshire and Oxfordshire in 1552 and of Hertfordshire and Buckinghamshire in 1553. He served as Lord Great Chamberlain from 1550 to 1553, in which role in 1551 he welcomed Mary of Guise, Regent of Scotland, to Hampton Court Palace on behalf of the King.

Parr, and especially his wife, were leaders in the attempt to put the Protestant Lady Jane Grey (daughter-in-law of Northumberland) on the throne after Edward's death (as that king had desired) in place of the other contender his half-sister the Roman Catholic Queen Mary. However his attempt failed and after the accession of Mary I in 1553 he was convicted of high treason, was attainted and sentenced to death on 18 August 1553. However he was released within a few months and following the accession of the Protestant Queen Elizabeth I, his titles were restored in 1559. He became a Knight of the Garter again on 24 April 1559.

Marriages
He married thrice but produced no issue:
Firstly, on 9 February 1527 at the chapel of the manor of Stanstead in Essex, to Anne Bourchier, suo jure 7th Baroness Bourchier (d. 26 Jan.1571), only child and heiress of Henry Bourchier, 2nd Earl of Essex (d.1540). Parr's mother had expended great sums to arrange the marriage, as she noted in her will. In 1542 she eloped from him, stating that "she would live as she lusted". On 17 April 1543 their marriage was annulled by an Act of Parliament and any of her children "born during esposels between Lord and Lady Parr" were declared bastards. Parr also obtained his ex-wife's lands and was himself created Earl of Essex on 23 December 1543. She predeceased Parr by only 9 months, having been awarded after her divorce a few of her father's former estates by Queen Mary. 
Secondly, in 1548, he married Elisabeth Brooke (1526-1565), a daughter of George Brooke, 9th Baron Cobham of Cobham Hall in Kent, by his wife Anne Bray. Their marriage was declared valid in 1548, invalid in 1553, and valid again in 1558. According to the International Genealogical Index (IGI), Parr may have had a son by Elizabeth Brooke, born in Prescot in 1542 and named Richard. 
 
Thirdly, in May 1571 (five months before his death), he married Helena Snakenborg (d.1635), First Lady of the Privy Chamber to Queen Elizabeth I, who had come to England from Sweden in 1565 in the train of Cecilia, Margravine of Baden. In 1580 she remarried to Sir Thomas Gorges (1536-1610) of Longford Castle in Wiltshire,  by whom she had issue, and was buried with her husband in Salisbury Cathedral, Wiltshire, where survives their impressive monument with recumbent effigies.

Death & burial

He died on 28 October 1571 at Warwick Priory, without issue, when his only surviving title of Marquess of Northampton became extinct. He was buried in the chancel of the Collegiate Church of St Mary, Warwick. Queen Elizabeth I paid for his funeral and burial. His surviving ledger stone is inscribed: William Parr, Marquis of Northampton; Died in Warwick 28 October 1571. [Buried] with the ceremonial due [of a] Knight of the Garter to the Order of Queen Elizabeth who bore the expense of the funeral, 2 December 1571.

See also
Attainder of Duke of Northumberland and others Act 1553

References

External links

 Dictionary of National Biography: Parr, William (1513-1571)

1513 births
1571 deaths
16th-century English nobility
Marquesses in the Peerage of England
Peers of England created by Henry VIII
Lord Great Chamberlains
Knights of the Garter
Lord-Lieutenants of Bedfordshire
Lord-Lieutenants of Buckinghamshire
Lord-Lieutenants of Cambridgeshire
Lord-Lieutenants of Huntingdonshire
Lord-Lieutenants of Northamptonshire
Lord-Lieutenants of Norfolk
Lord-Lieutenants of Surrey
Lord-Lieutenants of Berkshire
Lord-Lieutenants of Oxfordshire
Lord-Lieutenants of Hertfordshire
Marquesses of Northampton
William
Court of Henry VIII
Household of Henry Fitzroy